Andrew Culver (born August 30, 1953) is a Canadian-American composer and software entrepreneur. Culver's works have included chamber and orchestral music, electronic and computer music, sound sculpture and music sculpture, film, lighting, text pieces, and installations. He performs concerts with sound sources of his own invention that are based on the tensegrity structural principle as elaborated by Buckminster Fuller, a lifelong influence.

Career

Culver worked as John Cage’s creative assistant for 11 years, and was involved in all aspects of Cage’s musical, poetic, operatic and film work. He wrote the chance operations and compositional process software Cage used during that period, and directed Cage's operas, sound and light installations. He continued directing Cage installations and operas after the composer’s death, including posthumous premieres.

Culver was the founding member of Sonde, a music design and ensemble that grew out of McGill University.
Culver’s interests are varied in concept, technique and media. He has created and/or directed work in a wide variety of performance, theatrical, electronic, computer, audio-visual, sculptural and installation situations. He has written on art, music and anarchy since the 70’s, for publications such as the Montreal Star, Musicworks, and Circuit. He has developed software and database structures and invented or developed a variety of formal, structural, time, pitch and microtonal systems.

Culver's largest work is Ocean 1—133 (1994, 2006), the orchestral component of Ocean, which was conceived by John Cage and Merce Cunningham, with choreography by Merce Cunningham, electronic music by David Tudor, and design by Marsha Skinner. David Tudor provided and performed (before his death) the electronic music component, and artist Marsha Skinner, the lighting and costumes. The work is big: 90 minutes for 150 soloists in the round, without a conductor. It has been performed some 60 times, at Lincoln Center in New York, La Fenice in Venice, in Amsterdam, Brussels, Belfast, Berkeley, Montpelier and Japan, New York, London and Miami. Culver describes the work by saying, "There is no score. There's 150 solo parts. Everyone is a soloist."

Culver is the Founder and co-CEO of iLiv, a software and services company.

Culver also writes about music, art, and anarchy. He is the founder of Anarchic Harmony Foundation, a non-profit organization that funds and manages projects in the fields of music, opera, multimedia, etc. He is the inventor of the Anarchic Philharmonic.

References

1953 births
Living people
20th-century classical composers
20th-century American composers
20th-century American male musicians
20th-century Canadian composers
21st-century classical composers
21st-century American composers
21st-century American male musicians
American classical composers
American male classical composers
American writers about music
Canadian classical composers
Canadian writers about music
Experimental composers